The Siliștea is a left tributary of the river Morișca in Romania. It flows into the Morișca near Costești.

References

Rivers of Romania
Rivers of Botoșani County